The Argus  is a student funded newspaper, produced and distributed weekly for the students of Lakehead University, in Thunder Bay, Ontario, Canada. With a weekly distribution of 3,000 copies, it is printed on Mondays during the months of September through November and January through March.  Issues are available for free throughout the University, and at various locations throughout the city.  Every week The Argus strives to cover stories that pertain to students, both on the local and international level.

History
The Argus'''s first issue was printed on October 3, 1966 and was published by the Alma Mater Society of Lakehead University (which later became the Lakehead University Student Union).  Its first Editor-in-Chief was William Inglis and covered both university and international affairs.

Operation
The paper is controlled by an executive committee consisting of five paid staff members: three of which are voted in by a special committee at the end of the academic year (editor-in-chief, business manager, and production manager), as well as two other selected from the rest of the newspaper staff.  Eleven paid staff members make up the editorial body of the paper.

Any Lakehead University student may apply for membership to the Argus after having contributed printed works to the paper throughout the year and successfully petitioning the executive committee for admission.  Membership entitles a student to an honorarium for each article published, as well as other rights within the newspaper.  Articles are accepted for publication from any student, despite his or her membership in the newspaper, so long as they meet the content and quality requirements laid out by the editors.

Advertising sales are coordinated through the business manager on a weekly basis and are published within the newspaper as well as online.The Argus'' is a member of the Canadian University Press (CUP), and CUP's national advertising agency, Campus Plus.

See also
List of student newspapers in Canada
List of newspapers in Canada

References

External links
 The Argus Newspaper

Student newspapers published in Ontario
Newspapers published in Thunder Bay
Lakehead University
Weekly newspapers published in Ontario
Publications established in 1966
1966 establishments in Ontario